Je Yong-sam (Hangul 제용삼) (born 25 January, 1972) is a retired South Korean football player.

Club career 
Je Yong-sam was famous for scoring 2 goals in 1998 FA Cup final.

Honours

Club 
 Anyang LG Cheetahs
 K League (1) 2000
 Korean FA Cup (1) 1998

References

External links 
 

1972 births
Living people
Association football forwards
South Korean footballers
K League 1 players
FC Seoul players